James Bamford (born September 15, 1946) is an American author, journalist and documentary producer noted for his writing about United States intelligence agencies, especially the National Security Agency (NSA). The New York Times has called him "the nation's premier journalist on the subject of the National Security Agency"  and The New Yorker named him "the NSA's chief chronicler."  Bamford has taught at the University of California, Berkeley as a distinguished visiting professor and has written for The New York Times Magazine, The Atlantic, Harper's, and many other publications. In 2006, he won the National Magazine Award for Reporting for his writing on the war in Iraq published in Rolling Stone. He is also an Emmy nominated documentary producer for PBS and spent a decade as the Washington investigative producer for ABC's World News Tonight.  In 2015 he became the national security columnist for Foreign Policy magazine  and he also writes for The New Republic.  His book, The Shadow Factory: The Ultra-Secret NSA From 9/11 to the Eavesdropping on America, became a New York Times bestseller and was named by The Washington Post as one of "The Best Books of the Year." It is the third in a trilogy by Bamford on the NSA, following The Puzzle Palace (1982) and Body of Secrets (2001), also New York Times bestsellers. His latest book is * Spyfail: Foreign Spies, Moles, Saboteurs, and the Collapse of America’s Counterintelligence (2023).

Early life 
Bamford was born on September 15, 1946, in Atlantic City, New Jersey and raised in Natick, Massachusetts. During the Vietnam War, he spent three years in the United States Navy as an intelligence analyst assigned to a National Security Agency unit in Hawaii.  Following the Navy, he earned a Juris Doctor degree in International Law from Suffolk University Law School in Boston, Massachusetts; a post graduate diploma from the Institute on International and Comparative Law, University of Paris I Panthéon Sorbonne; and was awarded a fellowship at Yale Law School.

While in law school as a Navy reservist, Bamford blew the whistle on the NSA when he learned about a program that involved illegally eavesdropping on US citizens. He testified about the program in a closed hearing before the Church Committee, the congressional investigation that led to sweeping reforms of US intelligence abuses in the 1970s.

The Puzzle Palace and the Threat of Prosecution 
In 1982, following graduation, he wrote The Puzzle Palace: A Report on NSA, America's Most Secret Intelligence Agency (Houghton Mifflin) which became a national bestseller and won the top book award from Investigative Reporters and Editors, the professional association of investigative journalists.  Washingtonian magazine called it "a monument to investigative journalism" and The New York Times Book Review said, "Mr. Bamford has uncovered everything except the combination to the director's safe."

During the course of writing the book, Bamford discovered that the Justice Department in 1976 began a secret criminal investigation into widespread illegal domestic eavesdropping by the NSA.  As a result, he filed a request under the Freedom of Information Act (FOIA) for documents dealing with the investigation and several hundred pages were eventually released to him by the Carter administration.  However, when President Ronald Reagan took office, the Justice Department sought to stop publication of the book and demanded return of the documents, claiming they had been "reclassified" as top secret.  When Bamford refused, he was threatened with prosecution under the Espionage Act. In response, Bamford cited the presidential executive order on secrecy, which stated that once a document had been declassified it cannot be reclassified. As a result, President Reagan changed the executive order to indicate that once a document has been declassified it can be reclassified. However, due to ex post facto restrictions in the US Constitution, the new executive order could not be applied to Bamford and the information was subsequently published in The Puzzle Palace.

NSA Raid on the Marshall Library 
Following publication, however, the NSA continued its efforts against Bamford.  While writing The Puzzle Palace, the author made extensive use of documents from the George C. Marshall Research Library in Virginia. These included the private correspondence of William F. Friedman, one of the founders of the NSA.  Although none of the documents were classified, following the book's release the NSA sent agents to the library to order their removal.  The action led to a lawsuit (631 F.Supp. 416 (1986)) by the American Library Association (ALA) against the NSA, charging that the agency had no right to enter a private library and classify and remove Friedman's private papers.  Although the court criticized NSA, saying it “does not condone by any means NSA’s cavalier attitude toward its classification determination,” it nevertheless found in the agency's favor and dismissed the suit. The ALA appealed the dismissal to the U.S. Court of Appeals but Ruth Bader Ginsburg, who was at that time a judge on that court, ruled that the ALA lacked standing in the case. At the library, Bamford also had access to the private papers of Marshall S. Carter, a former director of the NSA whom he had interviewed.  But after the book was published, agency officials met with Carter at a secure location in Colorado, where he was in retirement, and threatened him with prosecution if he did not immediately close his collection and refrain from further interviews.  Carter reluctantly agreed to the demands.

Body of Secrets and A Pretext for War 
In 2001, Bamford released Body of Secrets: Anatomy of the Ultra-Secret NSA, From the Cold War to the Dawn of a New Century (Doubleday).  The second in his trilogy, it also became a national bestseller.  A cover review in The New York Times Book Review called it "an extraordinary work of investigative journalism" and it won the Investigative Reporters and Editors Gold Medal, the highest award given by the association.

In 2002, during the lead up to the war in Iraq, Bamford was one of the few journalists arguing that there were no weapons of mass destruction in Iraq and therefore the country should not go to war.  He made his arguments on the editorial pages of USA Today where he was a member of the newspaper's Board of Contributors.  And in 2004 he released A Pretext for War: 9/11, Iraq. and the Abuse of America’s Intelligence Agencies  (Doubleday), which became a bestseller.  Time, in a two-page review, said, “A Pretext for War is probably the best one-volume companion to the harrowing events in the war on terrorism since 1996.”  The Washington Post listed the book as one of “The Best of 2004” and in a cover review said, “Bamford does a superb job of laying out and tying together threads of the Sept. 11 intelligence failures and their ongoing aftermath.”  Bamford also wrote on the war in Iraq for Rolling Stone magazine and his 2005 article, “The Man Who Sold the War,”  won the National Magazine Award for Reporting, the highest award in magazine writing, and was included in Columbia University's The Best American Magazine Writing.

The Shadow Factory and ACLU v. NSA 
In 2006, following revelations in The New York Times that the NSA had been conducting illegal domestic eavesdropping for decades, Bamford joined writer Christopher Hitchens and several others as plaintiffs in a lawsuit (ACLU v. NSA, 493 F.3d 644) brought by the American Civil Liberties Union that challenged the constitutionality of the agency's surveillance. On August 17, 2006, District Court Judge Anna Diggs Taylor granted summary judgment for Bamford and the other plaintiffs, ruling that the surveillance was unconstitutional and illegal, and ordered that it be halted immediately.  However, she stayed her order pending appeal.  Later the Sixth Circuit Court of Appeals reversed the District Court ruling on the grounds that the plaintiffs could not show that they had been or would be subjected to surveillance personally, and therefore they lacked standing before the Court.

In 2008, Bamford released the third book in his trilogy, The Shadow Factory: The Ultra-Secret NSA From 9/11 to The Eavesdropping on America, which became a New York Times  bestseller and was named by The Washington Post as one of "The Best Books of the Year."

PBS and ABC News 
Bamford also writes and produces documentaries for PBS and in 2010 was nominated for an Emmy Award for his program, “The Spy Factory,”  which was based on his book, The Shadow Factory.  Earlier he spent a decade as the Washington investigative producer for ABC's World News Tonight, covering the White House as well as reporting from much of the world, including the Middle East during the Gulf War.  Among his awards was the Overseas Press Club Award for Excellence and the Society of Professional Journalists Deadline Award for the Best Investigative Reporting in Television.

Legal Cases 
Bamford has served as a defense consultant in a number of espionage cases, including U.S. v. Thomas Andrews Drake.  A former senior NSA official, in 2011 Drake was charged under the Espionage Act for allegedly leaking classified documents to the Baltimore Sun.  However, Bamford was able to show that all the materials the government claimed to be classified were actually freely available in the public domain, and placed there by the government itself.  As a result, the government was forced to throw out the charges against Drake in exchange for a misdemeanor plea for abusing his computer, with no jail time or even a fine. It was one of the very few times the government had been forced to dismiss charges in an espionage case.

Additionally, Bamford has testified as an expert witness on intelligence issues before committees of the Senate and House of Representatives as well as the European Parliament in Brussels and the International Criminal Tribunal for the former Yugoslavia.  He has also been a guest lecturer at the Central Intelligence Agency’s Senior Intelligence Fellows Program, the National Security Agency’s National Cryptologic School, the Defense Intelligence Agency’s Joint Military Intelligence College, the Pentagon’s National Defense University and the Director of National Intelligence’s National Counterintelligence Executive.  And he has been an invited speaker at colleges and universities in the U.S., Europe, and the Middle East, including Oxford, Harvard, Yale, the American University of Beirut and many others.

During the 2010s, Bamford wrote a number of cover stories for Wired magazine as a contributing editor, including “The Most Wanted Man in the World,”  the result of three days in Moscow with NSA whistleblower Edward Snowden, the longest any journalist has spent with him there.  And in 2015 he became the national security columnist for Foreign Policy Magazine and also writes for The New Republic.

Personal 
Bamford completed a circumnavigation of the surface of the earth, crossing every meridian of longitude by land and sea. In 2017 he was elected as a member of The Explorer's Club.

Publications

Books

Articles

References

External links
 Bamford, James. "The NSA Is Building the Country’s Biggest Spy Center (Watch What You Say)." (Archive) Wired. March 15, 2012.
 
 Booknotes interview with Bamford on Body of Secrets, September 16, 2001.
 The Spy Factory, PBS and WGBH-TV, Nova program series. February 3, 2009.
 
  in 2001
  in 2005
  in 2008
 James Bamford. The Man Who Sold the War, Rolling Stone, November 17, 2005.
 "Crypto man", Profile by Michael Scherer, Salon.com, December 2005
 James Bamford, The N.S.A.’s Chief Chronicler, profile by Alexander Nazaryan, The New Yorker, June 10, 2013
 "John Rendon, Bush's General in the Propaganda War", interview with Amy Goodman on Democracy Now!, November 21, 2005 (video, audio, and print transcript).
 Hour-long interview about The Shadow Factory and NSA spying with Amy Goodman on Democracy Now, October 14, 2008 (video, audio, and print transcript).
 Scott Horton. James Bamford's interviews, The Weekend Interview Show (December 3, 2005)
 Jenny Asarnow. James Bamford KUOW-FM Speaker's Forum (April 19, 2007)
 James Bamford interview (February 9, 2008)
 Kevin Zeese. "James Bamford: Inventing a Pretext for War", Democracy Rising (May 23, 2005)
 Steve Clemons. John Rendon and the U.S. propaganda, The Washington Note, (November 21, 2005)* William Sweet. "NSA Spying & FISA Court", IEEE Spectrum Radio interview (February 20, 2006)
 Section on James Bamford, Center for Cooperative Research.
 Report on a James Bamford talk at Berkeley, Lew Rockwell.com, (February 11, 2002)
 James Bamford. Washington Bends the Rules, The New York Times, (August 27, 2002)
 

1946 births
Living people
Historians of espionage
Espionage writers
American intelligence analysts
National Security Agency
American investigative journalists
American political writers
American whistleblowers
American television journalists
Journalists from Washington, D.C.
Suffolk University Law School alumni
United States Navy sailors
People from Natick, Massachusetts
American male journalists
21st-century American historians
21st-century American male writers
Historians from Massachusetts
American male non-fiction writers